Thyrsiini is a tribe of beetles in the subfamily Cerambycinae, containing the single genus Thyrsia and the following species:

 Thyrsia lateralis Dalman, 1819
 Thyrsia piranga Galileo & Martins, 2006

References

Cerambycinae